The Carpathians are the Carpathian Mountains, a range of mountains across Central Europe.

Carpathian may also refer to:

Places
 Carpathian Basin or Pannonian Basin, in Europe
 Carpathian Military District, a former district of the Soviet Armed Forces

Fiction
 The Carpathians, a novel by Janet Frame
 Carpathians (race), fictional characters in Christine Feehan's Dark Series
 Carpathia, a fictional planet settled by human refugees from Earth in the one-season BBC sci-fi series Outcasts

Other uses
 Carpathian, an Australian hardcore band
Carpathian Forest, a Norwegian black metal band
 RMS Carpathia, the ship that rescued the survivors of the RMS Titanic
 Carpathian League, a European ice hockey league
 Carpathian Euroregion, an international association formed in 1993
 Carpathian Shepherd Dog, a Romanian sheep dog
 Carpathian goat
 Carpathian newt
 Framework Convention on the Protection and Sustainable Development of the Carpathians or Carpathian Convention, a convention on sustainable development of the Carpathian region
 Montes Carpatus, a mountain range on the nearside of Earth's Moon

See also
 Carpathia (disambiguation)
 Carpathian Ruthenia (disambiguation)
 Carpathian Ukraine (disambiguation)
 Subcarpathian (disambiguation)
 Ciscarpathian (disambiguation)
 Transcarpathian (disambiguation)
 Transylvanian Carpathians (disambiguation)
 Karpathian, relating to Karpathos, a Greek island